Taiichi (written: 泰一 or 耐一) is a masculine Japanese given name. Notable people with the name include:

 (1912–1990), Japanese businessman
 (born 1974), Japanese sumo wrestler
 (born 1959), Japanese engineer

Japanese masculine given names